NCUBE may refer to:

Ncube (surname), a South African surname (includes a list of people with the name) 
nCUBE Corporation, was a parallel supercomputers maker, and later, provider of video on demand solutions, now a subsidiary of Arris Group via its C-COR acquisition
Ncube satellite, built by Norwegian students
Hypercube of n dimensions